Cyndaty  is a village in the administrative district of Gmina Siemiątkowo, within Żuromin County, Masovian Voivodeship, in East-Central Poland.

References

Cyndaty